Darna is a fictional character created by Filipino comics writer Mars Ravelo.

Darna may also refer to:
 Darna (1951 film), a film starring Rosa del Rosario
 Darna (1991 film), a film starring Nanette Medved
 Darna (upcoming film), an upcoming Philippine superhero film
 Darna (2022 TV series), a TV series starring Jane De Leon
 Darna (2005 TV series), a TV series starring Angel Locsin
 Darna (2009 TV series), a TV series starring Marian Rivera
 Darna (band), a Spanish heavy metal band
 Darna (album) (2001)
 Darna (moth), a moth genus of the family Limacodidae
 Darna, the belief in harmony and order in the Baltic neopaganism, corresponding roughly to dharma in Indic religions
 Darna, Nepal

See also
 Derna, Libya